is located in the Hidaka Mountains, Hokkaidō, Japan. The Nozuka Tunnel connects Hidaka and Tokachi subprefectures via Route 236 through Mount Nozuka.

See also
Nozuka Pass

References
 Google Maps
 Geographical Survey Institute
 Hokkaipedia

Nozuka